Cadoxton is a district of Barry in the Vale of Glamorgan, Wales. Cadoxton was once originally its own village, separate from Barry. It grew up around Saint Cadoc's parish church, which survives. It is also home to Cadoxton Primary School, situated opposite Victoria Park which in turn is opposite Crystal Springs Conservation Group. The Group was founded in 2005 and campaigned to save the field from housing. Cadoxton Nursery is located beside the primary school.

The area is served by Cadoxton railway station.

History 

Over the years remains have been found that suggest Cadoxton, (under a different name), was once a Roman settlement of some description.

The name 'Cadoxton' derives from the 6th century Saint, Cadoc, and the Old English word "ton" meaning settlement; the ancient parish church of St Cadoc still stands on Cowbridge Street — , it is part of the Church in Wales' Barry Ministry Area. The Welsh language name 'Tregatwg' is a direct translation, although the Welsh word is very rarely used by residents of Cadoxton or Barry. The ruins of a chapel dedicated to Cadoc's disciple, Saint Baruc, can still be seen in Friars Road on Barry Island.

The village grew rapidly in the 19th and 20th centuries after the construction of Barry Docks in 1889. Cadoxton was swallowed up by Barry during this time.

Governance
Cadoxton is part of the Cadoc electoral ward which elects three county councillors to the Vale of Glamorgan Council and three town councillors to Barry Town Council.

References

External links 
www.geograph.co.uk : photos of Cadoxton and surrounding area

Villages in the Vale of Glamorgan
Neighbourhoods of Barry, Vale of Glamorgan